SK3 (small conductance calcium-activated potassium channel 3) also known as KCa2.3 is a protein that in humans is encoded by the KCNN3 gene.

SK3 is a small-conductance calcium-activated potassium channel partly responsible for the calcium-dependent after hyperpolarisation current (IAHP). It belongs to a family of channels known as small-conductance potassium channels, which consists of three members – SK1, SK2 and SK3 (encoded by the KCNN1, 2 and 3 genes respectively), which share a 60-70% sequence identity. These channels have acquired a number of alternative names, however a NC-IUPHAR has recently achieved consensus on the best names, KCa2.1 (SK1), KCa2.2 (SK2) and KCa2.3 (SK3). Small conductance channels are responsible for the medium and possibly the slow components of the IAHP.

Structure

KCa2.3 contains 6 transmembrane domains, a pore-forming region, and intracellular N- and C- termini and is readily blocked by apamin. The gene for KCa2.3, KCNN3, is located on chromosome 1q21.

Expression

KCa2.3 is found in the central nervous system (CNS), muscle, liver, pituitary, prostate, kidney, pancreas and vascular endothelium tissues. KCa2.3 is most abundant in regions of the brain, but has also been found to be expressed in significant levels in many other peripheral tissues, particularly those rich in smooth muscle, including the rectum, corpus cavernosum, colon, small intestine and myometrium.

The expression level of KCNN3 is dependent on hormonal regulation, particularly by the sex hormone estrogen. Estrogen not only enhances transcription of the KCNN3 gene, but also affects the activity of KCa2.3 channels on the cell membrane. In GABAergic preoptic area neurons, estrogen enhanced the ability of α1 adrenergic receptors to inhibit KCa2.3 activity, increasing cell excitability. Links between hormonal regulation of sex organ function and KCa2.3 expression have been established. The expression of KCa2.3 in the corpus cavernosum in patients undergoing estrogen treatment as part of gender reassignment surgery was found to be increased up to 5-fold. The influence of estrogen on KCa2.3 has also been established in the hypothalamus, uterine and skeletal muscle.

Physiology
KCa2.3 channels play a major role in human physiology, particularly in smooth muscle relaxation. The expression level of KCa2.3 channels in the endothelium influences arterial tone by setting arterial smooth muscle membrane potential. The sustained activity of KCa2.3 channels induces a sustained hyperpolarisation of the endothelial cell membrane potential, which is then carried to nearby smooth muscle through gap junctions. Blocking the KCa2.3 channel or suppressing KCa2.3 expression causes a greatly increased tone in resistance arteries, producing an increase in peripheral resistance and blood pressure.

Pathology
Mutations in KCa2.3 are suspected to be a possible underlying cause for several neurological disorders, including schizophrenia, bipolar disorder, Alzheimer's disease, anorexia nervosa and ataxia as well as myotonic muscular dystrophy.

References

Further reading

Neurochemistry
Ion channels